Iran, officially the Islamic Republic of Iran since 1979, first participated at the Olympic Games in 1900. Iran has sent athletes to compete in every Summer Olympic Games since 1948, except for 1980 and 1984 due to political boycotts. Iran has also participated in the Winter Olympic Games on several occasions since 1956.

Iran has participated in 18 Olympics so far. Iran  participated in 9 Summer Olympics and gained 4 gold medals before that 1979 Revolution, also Iran participated in 9 Summer Olympics and it won 20 gold medals after the revolution.

Freydoun Malkom, a fencer who competed in the épée event in the 1900 Summer Olympics, was the first Iranian Olympic competitor. Iranian athletes have won a total of 76  medals, all in wrestling, weightlifting, taekwondo, athletics, shooting, and karate. Iran's National Olympic Committee was founded in 1947.

Medal tables

Medals by Summer Games

Medals by Winter Games

Medals by sport

List of medalists 

 Kianoush Rostami originally won the bronze medal, but was upgraded to silver on 26 November 2016 after the original silver medalist tested positive for doping.
 Saeid Mohammadpour originally finished 5th, but was upgraded to the gold medal position on 20 December 2016 since the top four weightlifters tested positive for doping.
 Komeil Ghasemi originally won the bronze medal, but was upgraded to gold on 26 July 2019 after the original gold and silver medalists tested positive for doping.
 Navab Nassirshalal originally won the silver medal, but was upgraded to gold on 19 December 2019 after the original gold medalist tested positive for doping.

Athletes with most medals 
 Athletes in bold are still active with Iran.

Sport by year

Summer Olympics

Winter Olympics

See also 
 List of flag bearers for Iran at the Olympics
 :Category:Olympic competitors for Iran
 Iran at the Asian Games

External links